Coenraad Christiaan Hiebendaal (10 April 1879 in Gorinchem – 3 June 1921 in Amsterdam) was a Dutch rower who competed in the 1900 Summer Olympics. He was part of the Dutch boat Minerva Amsterdam, which won the silver medal in the coxed fours final B. Coenraad Hiebendaal studied at the University of Amsterdam. Later in his life he became a physician.

References

External links

 Profile

1879 births
1921 deaths
Dutch male rowers
Olympic rowers of the Netherlands
Rowers at the 1900 Summer Olympics
Olympic silver medalists for the Netherlands
Sportspeople from Gorinchem
Olympic medalists in rowing
Medalists at the 1900 Summer Olympics